Vicki Risch is the former first lady of Idaho and the wife of U.S. senator Jim Risch, who served as governor of Idaho in 2006.  She became first lady on May 26, 2006, when her husband succeeded former governor, Dirk Kempthorne, who resigned to become United States Secretary of the Interior. Risch succeeded former first lady, Patricia Kempthorne, who had held the post for over seven years.  Risch served as first lady until January 2007, as her husband did not seek a full term as governor, but rather was reelected to his old post as lieutenant governor.

References

First Ladies and Gentlemen of Idaho
Living people
Year of birth missing (living people)